Epinotia maculana is a moth of the family Tortricidae. It is found in most of Europe (except Iceland, the Iberian Peninsula, Ukraine, and most of the Balkan Peninsula), east to the eastern part of the Palearctic realm.

The wingspan is 17–23 mm. The forewings are ashy-grey, with the basal portion dark and nebulose, and the apical part waved with slender black streaks, towards the inner margin before the middle is an obscure black dot, and a larger red-brown one towards the anal angle, but nearly obsolete. The hind wings are  brown and shining. Adults are on wing from August to October.

The larvae feed on Populus tremula and possibly other Populus species. They feed within rolled leaves.

References

External links
 Fauna Europaea
 UKmoths

Eucosmini
Moths described in 1775
Moths of Asia
Tortricidae of Europe
Moths of Japan
Taxa named by Johan Christian Fabricius